Naomi Sequeira (born 29 December 1994) is an Australian actress, singer and songwriter. She was the co-host of Disney Channel Australia's Hanging with Adam & Naomi with Adam Roberts and was nominated for a 2015 Astra Award for most outstanding presenter for Hanging with.

In 2014, she began in the lead role of Tara Crossley in the Disney Channel drama series. The Evermoor Chronicles, filmed in England and aired in 160 countries.  Sequeira's debut single, Blank Paper, was released on 1 March 2016, and her first EP was released later that year. She currently resides in Sydney, Australia.

Filmography

Awards

References

External links 
 
 

Australian television actresses
Living people
1994 births
Australian people of Portuguese descent
21st-century Australian actresses
21st-century Australian singers
Actresses from Sydney
Singers from Sydney
Australian film actresses